Carabus exiguus fanianus is a bronze-coloured subspecies of ground beetle in the subfamily Carabinae that is endemic to Shaanxi, China.

References

exiguus fanianus
Beetles described in 1993
Endemic fauna of China